Tennessee's 23rd Senate district is one of 33 districts in the Tennessee Senate. It has been represented by Republican Jack Johnson, the current Senate Majority Leader, since 2006.

Geography
District 23 is exactly coterminous with Williamson County in the southern suburbs of Nashville, including the communities of Franklin, Brentwood, Fairview, Thompson's Station, Nolensville, and part of Spring Hill.

The district is located entirely within Tennessee's 7th congressional district, and overlaps with the 61st, 63rd, and 65th districts of the Tennessee House of Representatives.

Recent election results
Tennessee Senators are elected to staggered four-year terms, with odd-numbered districts holding elections in midterm years and even-numbered districts holding elections in presidential years.

2018

2014

Federal and statewide results in District 23

References 

23
Williamson County, Tennessee